Assa (Асса) is a 1987 Soviet crime film directed and co-written by Sergei Solovyov. It became a cult film, mainly due to the fact that it was one of the films that brought Russian rock music from the underground into the mainstream. Solovyov made a sequel to the film twenty years later, 2-ASSA-2.

While there are no causal links to it, Sovietology uses the release of Assa as a benchmark for when Perestroika reached the mass culture, and accordingly, entered its prime phase. This could be explained by the fact that the film was the first sanctioned production to feature previously-banned musicians.

Plot
The film has several plot lines. The main plot takes place in the winter of 1980 and tells the story of Alika (Tatyana Drubich), a young nurse who stays in Yalta with her patient and lover Krymov (Stanislav Govorukhin), who is considerably older than she is. Krymov is the head of a criminal group and is being watched by inept KGB agents, but Alika is not completely aware of it. In Yalta Alika meets Bananan (Sergei "Afrika" Bugaev), a young and eccentric underground rock musician, who introduces her to the Soviet counterculture. When Krymov discovers that Alika is developing a relationship with Bananan, he becomes jealous and tries to convince Bananan to leave Alika and Yalta altogether; after Bananan refuses, Krymov's minions murder him. When he tells Alika about this, she murders him and is arrested by the Militsiya, although they treat her gently.

Another minor plot line shows the history of the murder of tsar Paul I of Russia. It is based on a book by Natan Eidelman, which Krymov is shown reading throughout the movie.

Experimental scenes and Russian rock relation
Besides the two conventional plot lines, the film is notable for having many experimental scenes which are only loosely related to the plot: Bananan's surreal dreams, "footnotes" with explanation of Russian rock slang and performances of complete Russian rock songs by Aquarium, Bravo, Soyuz kompozitorov, Yury Chernavsky with Vesyolye Rebyata and Kino. Boris Grebenshchikov of Aquarium wrote the film's instrumental soundtrack and he is also referenced in the film's dialog: Bananan tells Krymov that Grebenshchikov "is a God who radiates light".

The film's memorable final scene symbolizes the liberation of Russian music from the state-imposed restrictions. In the scene, which is barely related to the plot, Bananan's bandmate brings Viktor Tsoi, the singer of Kino, portrayed by himself, to work in a restaurant as a singer; the restaurant manager starts reading to him the strict rules that all restaurant performers must follow, but instead of listening to her, Tsoi goes straight to the stage and starts singing I Want Changes! (Хочу перемен!); after some time the camera turns around and shows that he's not in a restaurant, but in front of a huge admiring crowd of young people in a theatre. This song became strongly associated with the social changes in the Soviet Union in the times of Perestroika and Glasnost in late 1980s, and the opposition movement Solidarnost chose it as its anthem.

Another experimental scene shows one of Krymov's minions (Alexander Bashirov) being interrogated about Krymov's criminal activities. In an attempt to avoid squealing he pretends to be insane and reads a monologue about being traumatized by the death of Yuri Gagarin. The monologue was improvised by Bashirov.

Cast 
 Sergei "Afrika" Bugaev as Bananan
 Tatyana Drubich as Alika
 Stanislav Govorukhin  as Andrey Valentinovich Krymov ("Svan")
 Dmitriy Shumilov as Vitya, Bananan's friend
 Aleksandr Bashirov as Shurik Babakin ("Major"), thief
 Anatoly Slivnikov as "Thug", thief
 Viktor Beshlyaga as Albert Petrovich, little actor
 Anita Zhukovskaya as Zoya, Albert's wife
 German Shorr as "Blain", thief
 Ilya Ivanov as "Ball", thief
 Svetlana Tormakhova as Marya Antonovna, Bananan's mother
 Aleksandr Domogarov as Aleksandr I

The film features cameo appearances by Viktor Tsoi, Yuri Kasparyan, Sergey Ryizhenko, Timur Novikov, Andrey Krisanov and Georgy Guryanov.

Soundtrack 
 Hello, Bananan Boy (Здравствуй, мальчик Бананан) — Yury Chernavsky and Vesiolie Rebiata
 I Go To You (Иду на ты) —  Boris Grebenshchikov and Aquarium
 Air Force (ВВС) — Aleksandr Sinitsin and Soyuz Kompozitorov band
 Chick Blues (Мочалкин блюз) —  Boris Grebenshchikov and Aquarium
 The Plane (Плоскость) —  Boris Grebenshchikov and Aquarium
 Old Kozlodoyev (Старик Козлодоев) —  Boris Grebenshchikov and Aquarium
 City Of Gold (Город золотой) —  Boris Grebenshchikov and Aquarium
 Wonderful Land (Чудесная страна) — Jeanne Aguzarova and Bravo
 I Want Change (Хочу перемен) — Viktor Tsoi and Kino

References

External links
 
 
 

1980s crime drama films
Russian rock music films
Russian musical drama films
Soviet musical drama films
Soviet crime drama films
Russian crime drama films
Cultural depictions of Paul I of Russia
Films set in 1801
Films set in 1980
Films set in Crimea
Films set in Saint Petersburg
Films set in the Soviet Union
Films shot in Crimea
Films shot in Moscow
Films shot in Saint Petersburg
Films directed by Sergei Solovyov
Films scored by Boris Grebenshchikov
1987 drama films
1987 films
Soviet teen films